Earl of Lovelace was a title in the Peerage of the United Kingdom. It was created in 1838 for William King-Noel, 8th Baron King, a title created in 1725.

History
The King or Locke King family stems from the elevation of the son of Jerome King, a grocer, of Exeter, and his wife Anne, great-niece of the philosopher John Locke. This son was Sir Peter King, a prominent lawyer and politician who served as Lord Chief Justice of the Common Pleas from 1714 to 1725 and as Lord High Chancellor of Great Britain from 1725 to 1733; as such in 1725 he was created Baron King of Ockham in the County of Surrey, in the Peerage of Great Britain (verbally and less formally Lord King).  The estate he bought was chosen as his territorial designation.

He was succeeded by his eldest son (the second Baron). He represented Launceston and Exeter in the House of Commons but died aged 34. His three younger brothers: Peter, William and Thomas all succeeded in the barony. The last was succeeded by his son, the sixth Baron.

His son, the seventh Baron, was a Whig politician and writer. On his 1833 death the title passed to his eldest son, the eighth Baron.  In 1835, Lord King married as his first wife the Hon. (Augusta) Ada Byron, the only daughter of the poet, Lord Byron, and his wife, 11th Baroness Wentworth who was a descendant of the extinct Barons Lovelace.  In 1838 he was created Viscount Ockham (territorial designation the same, to be the family's first courtesy title), and Earl of Lovelace in the Peerage of the United Kingdom. He was appointed the Lord-Lieutenant of Surrey from 1840 to 1893.  Ada died in 1852, leaving her husband, in his forties, a widower. In 1860, he assumed for himself the additional surname and arms of Noel, those of Wentworth.  In 1865 he remarried, to Jane Crawford Jenkins and had one child, who would go on eventually to inherit the earldom.

Lord Lovelace acquired Horsley Towers (now a hotel) in East Horsley and was patron of the parish church funding the rebuilding of the chancel and the nave in 1869. He also rebuilt the wall of the churchyard which included a number of architectural features such as the gazebo and its family crest-engraved walls. He planned for his death 20 years before he died when began work on his mausoleum in another corner of the churchyard. The mausoleum, which has recently been restored, contains his tomb and that of his second wife. His eldest son Byron (King) Noel, Viscount Ockham, briefly succeeded his maternal grandmother to become twelfth Baron Wentworth according to its special remainder in 1860. However, he predeceased his father, unmarried two years later.

Lord Lovelace was therefore succeeded by his second surviving son who was thus already Lord Wentworth.

In 1861, this still untitled son had assumed by Royal licence the surname of Milbanke in lieu of Noel. He had no sons and was succeeded in the barony of Wentworth by his only child, Ada King-Milbanke, 14th Baroness Wentworth.  The 2nd Earl (Lord Lovelace) was succeeded in the titles other than the Wentworth one by his half-brother. In 1895, Lord Lovelace received for himself only Royal licence to use the additional surname and arms of Noel, but resumed by Royal licence, in 1908, the surname and arms of King only for himself and his children.

He served in the First World War as a Major in the Northumberland Fusiliers and as a staff-Captain.  The titles were finally held by his grandson, the fifth Earl, who succeeded his father in 1964.  The last Earl inherited the title in 1964 and died in 2018.

The family seat following its purchase by the 1st Lord King was Ockham Park, Ockham, Surrey until the fine Jacobean house was reduced to outbuildings in a fire in 1948.  The family has moved its main home to Torridon House, near Torridon in Ross-shire.

Notable wives

Ada Lovelace was an English mathematician and writer chiefly known for her work on Charles Babbage's early mechanical general-purpose computer, the Analytical Engine. Her notes on the engine include what is recognised as the first algorithm intended to be processed by a machine. Because of this, she is often described as the world's first computer programmer.

Notable younger sons and their sons

The Hon. Peter King, second son of the seventh Lord King (and brother of the first Earl of Lovelace), was a long-serving progressive politician who bought Brooklands and the father of Hugh F. Locke King, the entrepreneur who transformed it into a pioneering racetrack and aviation centre from the year 1906 onwards.

The family had no male heirs. Hugh died without children in 1926 and his elder brother Peter died in middle age in 1885 in Aston without sons.

Barons King (1725) (of Ockham)
Peter King, 1st Baron King (1669–1734)
John King, 2nd Baron King (1706–1740)
Peter King, 3rd Baron King (1709–1754)
William King, 4th Baron King (1711–1767)
Thomas King, 5th Baron King (1712–1779)
Peter King, 6th Baron King (1736–1793)
Peter King, 7th Baron King (1776–1833)
William King, 8th Baron King (1805–1893) (created Earl of Lovelace in 1838)

Earls of Lovelace (1838)
William King-Noel, 1st Earl of Lovelace (1805–1893)
Byron King-Noel, Viscount Ockham (1836–1862), his eldest son; also 12th Baron Wentworth
Ralph King-Milbanke, 2nd Earl of Lovelace (1839–1906), his younger brother; also 13th Baron Wentworth, in which he was succeeded by his only daughter
Major Lionel King, 3rd Earl of Lovelace (1865–1929), his younger half-brother
Peter King, 4th Earl of Lovelace (1905–1964), his only son
Peter King, 5th Earl of Lovelace (1951–2018), his only child

Family of the 1st Earl of Lovelace

William King-Noel, 1st Earl of Lovelace né King (1805–1893) ∞ Hon. Ada Augusta Byron née Noel (1815–1852) (1) ∞ Jane Crawford Jenkins (2)
Byron King-Noel, Viscount Ockham (1836–1862), also 12th Baron Wentworth (1860–1862), deserted Royal Navy
Anne Isabella Noel King-Noel (1837–1917), de jure 15th Baroness Wentworth ∞ Wilfred Scawen Blunt, poet
Judith Anne Dorothea Blunt-Lytton, 16th Baroness Wentworth (1873-1957) ∞ Neville Stephen Bulwer-Lytton, 3rd Earl of Lytton (1879–1951), see Earl of Lytton for her title's current vesting into Earldom
Noel Anthony Scawen Lytton, 4th Earl of Lytton and 17th Baron Wentworth (1900–1985) ∞ Clarissa Palmer 
Lady Caroline Mary Noel Lytton (1947–2017)
John Peter Michael Scawen Lytton, 5th Earl of Lytton and 18th Baron Wentworth (b. 1950) ∞ Ursula Alexandra Komoly 
Hon. (Thomas) Roland Cyril Lawrence Lytton (b. 1954)
Lady Lucy Mary Frances Lytton (b. 1957)
Lady Sarah Teresa Mary Lytton (b. 1959)
Lady Anne Lytton (1901–1979)
Lady Winifred Lytton (b.1904–1985) ∞ Claude Tryon
Ralph Gordon Noel King, 2nd Earl of Lovelace, 13th Baron Wentworth - extended Noel King name twice (1839–1906) ∞ Fannie Heriot d. 1878 (1) ∞ Mary Caroline Stuart-Wortley (2)
Lady Ada Mary King-Milbanke, 14th Baroness Wentworth (1871–1917) 
Major Lionel Fortescue King, 3rd Earl of Lovelace (1865–1929) DSO (son by second marriage) ∞ Lady Edith Anson
Peter Malcolm King, 4th Earl of Lovelace (1905–1964) ∞ Doris Evison (1) died 1940 ∞ Lis Manon Transö (2)
Peter Axel William Locke King, 5th Earl of Lovelace (1951–2018)
Lady Evelyn Catherine King (1896–1974) ∞ Maj.-Gen. Sir Miles Graham, divorced 1930 (1) ∞ Mark Patrick (2) and had issue
Lady Phyllis Edith King (1897–1947) ∞ William Allen, divorced 1932 and had issue
Lady Rosemary Diana King (1902–1955) ∞ Lt.-Col. Alistair Gibb, divorced 1940 (1) ∞ Martin de Hosszu (2)<ref>Burke's Peerage, 107th Ed., 2003, London, vol. 2 page 2417</ref> 

The 5th Earl had no heir to the Earldom, the subsidiary title of Viscount Ockham or the King of Ockham Barony so these became extinct at his death.

Notes

 
 References 
 

 Sources 
Kidd, Charles, Williamson, David (editors). Debrett's Peerage and Baronetage'' (1990 edition). New York: St Martin's Press, 1990.

Extinct earldoms in the Peerage of the United Kingdom
1838 establishments in the United Kingdom
2018 disestablishments in the United Kingdom
Noble titles created in 1838